In 4-dimensional geometry, the tetrahedral cupola is a polychoron bounded by one tetrahedron, a parallel cuboctahedron, connected by 10 triangular prisms, and 4 triangular pyramids.

Related polytopes
The tetrahedral cupola can be sliced off from a runcinated 5-cell, on a hyperplane parallel to a tetrahedral cell. The cuboctahedron base passes through the center of the runcinated 5-cell, so the Tetrahedral cupola contains half of the tetrahedron and triangular prism cells of the runcinated 5-cell. The cupola can be seen in A2 and A3 Coxeter plane orthogonal projection of the runcinated 5-cell:

See also
 Tetrahedral pyramid (5-cell)

References

External links
 Segmentochora: tetaco, tet || co, K-4.23 

4-polytopes